Michael Albasini (born 20 December 1980) is a Swiss former professional road bicycle racer, who rode professionally between 2003 and 2020, for the , ,  and  teams.

Professional career

From 2012 until his retirement, Albasini rode with the Australian professional cycling team .

In 2012, Albasini met success at the UCI World Tour race Volta a Catalunya. On the very next stage, he was part of a select group of about 20 riders that were led to the line by Bradley Wiggins after a day in the mountains and he outsprinted his rivals, taking his second win in a row.

In 2015, Albasini took a prestigious podium placing at the La Flèche Wallonne, coming in third place atop the Mur de Huy behind Alejandro Valverde and Julian Alaphilippe. He later won the second stage of the Tour de Romandie, having the better in the sprint of a group of 49 riders who had survived the climb and descent of the Col de la Vue des Alpes. He repeated the feat the very next day in Porrentruy, winning by a couple of bike lengths over Julian Alaphilippe. He had to abandon the Tour de France on Stage 5, suffering from a broken arm after a crash.

In October 2019, Albasini announced that he would retire from the sport after the 2020 Tour de Suisse. Following that race's cancellation due to the COVID-19 pandemic in Switzerland, Albasini announced that he intended to extend his career to the end of the 2020 season.

Major results

1998
 1st  Road race, National Junior Road Championships
2001
 4th Overall Ster Elektrotoer
 6th Overall Grand Prix Guillaume Tell
2002
 1st  Road race, UEC European Under-23 Road Championships
 5th Overall Grand Prix Guillaume Tell
 7th Overall GP Kranj
1st Stage 1
 7th Giro del Lago Maggiore
2004
 5th Züri-Metzgete
 9th Paris–Bourges
2005
 Tour de Suisse
1st  Sprints classification
1st Stage 5
 7th Overall Three Days of De Panne
 10th Giro della Romagna
2006
 Tour de Suisse
1st  Mountains classification
1st  Sprints classification
 3rd Grand Prix de Fourmies
2007
 5th Overall Circuit de la Sarthe
1st Stage 4
2008
 2nd Overall Tour de Luxembourg
1st Stage 3
 2nd GP Miguel Induráin
 3rd Overall Tour Méditerranéen
 6th Tour du Haut Var
 7th La Flèche Wallonne
 8th Gran Premio di Lugano
2009
 1st  Overall Tour of Austria
1st Stage 2
 1st Stage 4 Tour of the Basque Country
 1st Stage 5 Tour de Suisse
 9th La Flèche Wallonne
2010
 1st  Overall Tour of Britain
1st Stage 3
 4th Overall Tour de Pologne
 10th La Flèche Wallonne
2011
 1st Grand Prix of Aargau Canton
 1st Stage 13 Vuelta a España
 1st  Mountains classification, Tour of the Basque Country
 3rd Overall Bayern Rundfahrt
1st Stage 3
 4th Overall Tour of Oman
2012
 1st  Overall Volta a Catalunya
1st Stages 1 & 2
 1st Stage 8 Tour de Suisse
 2nd Road race, National Road Championships
 2nd La Flèche Wallonne
 4th Grand Prix of Aargau Canton
2013
 1st Grand Prix of Aargau Canton
 1st Stage 4 Paris–Nice
 1st Stage 4 (TTT) Tour de France
2014
 1st Tre Valli Varesine
 Tour de Romandie
1st Stages 1, 2 & 4
 2nd Road race, National Road Championships
 5th Grand Prix of Aargau Canton
 6th Giro di Lombardia
 7th Trofeo Muro-Port d'Alcúdia
 7th La Flèche Wallonne
2015
 Tour de Romandie
1st Stages 2 & 3
 2nd Grand Prix of Aargau Canton
 3rd La Flèche Wallonne
2016
 Tour de Romandie
1st  Points classification
1st Stage 5
 2nd Liège–Bastogne–Liège
 7th La Flèche Wallonne
2017
 1st Coppa Ugo Agostoni
 1st Stage 2 Tour of the Basque Country
 1st Stage 1 Tour de Romandie
 2nd Vuelta a La Rioja
 3rd Amstel Gold Race
 4th Grand Prix of Aargau Canton
 4th Coppa Bernocchi
 4th Gran Premio Bruno Beghelli
 5th La Flèche Wallonne
 7th Road race, UCI Road World Championships
 7th Liège–Bastogne–Liège
 10th Tre Valli Varesine
2018
 1st  Overall Tour des Fjords
1st  Points classification
1st Stage 2
 7th Road race, UEC European Road Championships
2019
 4th Time trial, National Road Championships
 10th Grand Prix of Aargau Canton
 10th Coppa Sabatini

Grand Tour results timeline

References

External links

 Profile at ORICA-GreenEDGE official website
 
 
 
 
 
 
 

1980 births
Living people
Swiss male cyclists
Tour de Suisse stage winners
Swiss Vuelta a España stage winners
People from Mendrisio
Cyclists at the 2012 Summer Olympics
Cyclists at the 2016 Summer Olympics
Olympic cyclists of Switzerland
Sportspeople from Ticino